Tamara Nokulunga Jozi (12 December 1956 – 6 August 2021), was a South African actress and television personality. She is best known for commercial advertisement "the Wimpy", where she keeps asking "Thabo, when are you getting married?".

Personal life
She died on the 6th of August 2021 at the age of 64 from natural causes.

Career
She was a household name in television, newspapers and billboard advertisements. Apart from appearing in many television commercials, she had a notable role in the soapie Soul City. Then she acted in the short film Secrets and Lies. Then she joined the e.tv soap opera Rhythm City and the SABC1 dramatization serial Society. In 2013, she joined the season 2 of SABC1 serial After 9. Apart from that, she also acted in the serials Gauteng Maboneng, Isibaya, Scandal!, and Lithapo.

Apart from television, she also acted in the feature film The Long Run in 2001 and the short film Die Soldaat in 2014. In 2014, she competed in an episode of the e.tv game show I Love South Africa. Her final television appearance came through the M-Net thriller serial Reyka  where she played the role of "Bongi's grandmother".

Filmography

References

External links
 IMDb

1956 births
2021 deaths
South African film actresses
South African television actresses